Gong Min-hyun (born 19 January 1990) is a South Korean footballer who plays as forward for Daejeon Hana Citizen FC in K League 2.

Career
He was selected by Bucheon FC 1995 in the 2013 K League draft.

References

External links 

1990 births
Living people
Association football forwards
South Korean footballers
Bucheon FC 1995 players
Asan Mugunghwa FC players
Seongnam FC players
K League 2 players
K League 1 players
Sportspeople from Gwangju